The cabinet of the Government of Serbia, led by prime minister Ana Brnabić, was elected on 29 June 2017 by a majority vote in the National Assembly. It succeeded the second cabinet of Aleksandar Vučić, formed after the 2016 parliamentary election, after Vučić resigned the prime minister post following his election as the President of Serbia. Vučić appointed Ana Brnabić, previously the Minister of Public Administration, as his successor on 15 June 2017.

History
The cabinet comprises ministers from the Serbian Progressive Party (SNS), Socialist Party of Serbia (SPS), Social Democratic Party of Serbia (SDPS), Movement of Socialists (PS), Party of United Pensioners of Serbia (PUPS), and Serbian National Party (SNP), as well as some without a party affiliation. It consists mostly of the same ministers from the previous cabinet, with three new members introduced: Branko Ružić (SPS) taking the Brnabić's previous ministry, Goran Trivan (SPS) taking the new post of Minister of Environmental Protection, and Nenad Popović (SNP) a minister without portfolio in charge of innovations. Aleksandar Vulin, formerly the Minister of Labour, and Zoran Đorđević, formerly the Minister of Defence, swapped places. Jadranka Joksimović, formerly a minister without portfolio, assumed the new Ministry of European Integration. The cabinet was approved by 157 votes for and 57 against, out of 250 members of the National Assembly.

On 7 May 2018, Minister of Finance Dušan Vujović resigned from the position due to personal reasons. On 28 May 2018, Siniša Mali, at the time Mayor of Belgrade, was appointed as the new Minister of Finance.

Cabinet members
Nominating party:

References

Cabinets of Serbia
2017 establishments in Serbia
Cabinets established in 2017
2020 disestablishments in Serbia
Cabinets disestablished in 2020